Houstonia canadensis, common name Canadian summer bluet, is a plant species native to the United States and Canada. It has been reported from Ontario, Saskatchewan, New York, Pennsylvania, Ohio, Indiana, Illinois, Michigan, Kentucky, Missouri, Tennessee, West Virginia, western Virginia, and mountainous regions of western North Carolina, western South Carolina, and northern Georgia.

References

canadensis
Flora of Eastern Canada
Flora of the Eastern United States
Plants described in 1818